The Copa de Campeones del Perú - Felipe Ríos was a Peruvian football championship to be contested by the winners of Liga Peruana de Football.

Alianza Lima played two matches on the same day, the first was to define the champion of the 1919 Liga Peruana de Football and the second for the Copa de Campeones. In the Liga Peruana match they defeated Alianza Chorrillos by walkover on the last date and in the definition for the Copa de Campeones they defeated Jorge Chávez N°1.

Champions

Final

Titles by club

References

External links
Soccerway.com
Peruvian Football League News 

Football competitions in Peru
1919 in Peruvian football
Peru
Defunct sports competitions in Peru